John Edmund Martineau (1904 – 3 June 1982) was an English brewer and brewing executive, who served as President of the Institute of Brewing.

Life
John Edmund Martineau was born in 1904, the eldest son of Maurice Martineau, of Walsham-le-Willows in Suffolk. In 1936, he married Catherine Makepeace Thackeray (1911–1995), second daughter of William Thackeray Dennis Ritchie (1880–1964), of Woodend House in Marlow, Durham, a descendant of William Makepeace Thackeray. Martineau was the great grandson of an earlier John Martineau who was an early part owner of Whitbreads in the 1800s, when in 1812 Whitbread had merged with the Martineau Brewery. However, John Martineau, his great grandfather had died in an industrial accident in a yeast vat in the brewery in 1834 and his shares in Whitbread passed to his son, who also took a role in future management.

Martineau was educated at Eton and New College, Oxford, where he completed a classics degree. He worked at Mure's Brewery in Hampstead, before joining Whitbread & Co's in 1925; promotion to managing director followed in 1931, making him the fifth member of his family to sit on Whitbread's Board since it took over the family business, Martineau and Bland, in 1812. During the Second World War, he served in the Royal Air Force, rising to the rank of Wing Commander and ending with a posting at the Directorate of War Organisation in the Air Ministry. After the war, he returned to Whitbread's and was responsible for overseeing research and technical affairs, including the re-opening of its laboratory in 1946. Martineau worked closely with the Head Brewer, Bill Lasman, and the pair tried to apply scientific advances to brewing. According to his obituary, Whitbread's Luton brewery "would never have been built in that matter if not for the training and encouragement they gave to the technical staff".

In 1950, Martineau joined the Council of the Brewers' Society, an appointment which would last for sixteen years. At the same time, he was appointed Chairman of the Publications Committee at the Institute of Brewing, in which post he remained until 1952. Between 1954 and 1956, he served as President of the Institute of Brewing and in 1955 he was appointed Master of the Brewers' Company for a year. He had overseen the reconstruction of the latter company's bomb-damaged hall after the war as Chairman of the Hall Committee. Away from his profession, Martineau was also chairman of the governors at Dame Alice Owen's School and Aldenham School.

His obituary in the Journal of the Institute of Brewing records that "his heart was especially close to research and to education" in the brewing industry; he was described as don-like and an intellectual. He died on 3 June 1982.

References

1904 births
1982 deaths
20th-century English businesspeople
Alumni of New College, Oxford
English brewers
Masters of the Worshipful Company of Brewers
People educated at Eton College
People from Walsham-le-Willows
Whitbread people